On 30 September 2022, Russia, amid an ongoing invasion of Ukraine, unilaterally declared its annexation of areas in and around four Ukrainian oblasts – Luhansk, Donetsk, Zaporizhzhia and Kherson. The boundaries of the areas to be annexed and their borders were not defined; Russian officials stated that they would be defined later. None of the oblasts were fully under Russian control at the time of the declaration. If limited to the areas then under Russian control (about 90,000 sq km or 15% of Ukraine's territory) the annexation would still be the largest in Europe since World War II.

The annexation occurred after internationally unrecognized referendums held days prior, which were organized by Russian occupation authorities in territories where hostilities were ongoing and much of the population had fled. It occurred seven months after the start of the invasion and less than a month after the start of the Ukrainian Kharkiv counteroffensive. The signing ceremony was held in the Grand Kremlin Palace in Moscow in the presence of occupation authority heads Leonid Pasechnik, Denis Pushilin, Yevgeny Balitsky and Volodymyr Saldo, and Russian president Vladimir Putin.

The annexation is unrecognized by the international community, with the exception of North Korea and Syria. Ukraine, the European Union, the United States, and the United Nations all said that the referendums and the annexation had no legal basis or effect. Ukrainian President Volodymyr Zelenskyy said in response that Ukraine would apply to join NATO on an expedited basis. Martial law was introduced on 19 October within the annexed areas, with legislation allowing for bans on public gatherings and other widespread restrictions on personal liberty.

The Ukrainian Kherson and Kharkiv counteroffensives allowed Ukraine to recapture parts of its territory, including Kherson City on 11 November.

Background

Vast regions to the north of the Black Sea were sparsely populated and were known as the Wild Fields (as translated from Polish or Ukrainian). In the 15th century, the entire area of the northern coast of the Black Sea came under the control of the Crimean Khanate, which became a vassal of the Ottoman Empire. The Russian Empire gradually gained control over the area in the 18th century, signing peace treaties with the Cossack Hetmanate and with the Ottoman Empire after the Russo-Turkish Wars. The name Novorossiya entered official usage in 1764. It was further expanded by annexing the Ukrainian Cossack Zaporozhian Sich in 1775.

The four oblasts in southern and eastern Ukraine originated from Yekaterinoslav, Kherson, Taurida and Kharkov Governorates and Don Host Oblast of the Russian Empire. They were reorganized over the years during Communist rule when Ukraine was part of the Soviet Union. The boundaries remained static after Ukraine became independent in 1991. All four regions overwhelmingly voted in favour of Ukrainian independence during the 1991 Ukrainian independence referendum.

In February and March 2014, Russia occupied and subsequently annexed Crimea from Ukraine by way of holding a referendum in which purportedly 96% of the local population voted in favour of the annexation, with Crimean Tatars boycotting it. The annexation was mostly internationally unrecognized and was condemned by the UN General Assembly. In April 2014, pro-Russian separatists in eastern Ukraine proclaimed the independence of the Donetsk People's Republic (in Ukraine's Donetsk Oblast) and the Luhansk People's Republic (in Ukraine's Luhansk Oblast) with unofficial support from Russia.

On 21 February 2022, Russia officially recognized the Donetsk People's Republic and the Luhansk People's Republic and, three days later, started a full-scale invasion of Ukraine, during which they occupied territory in the Kherson and Zaporizhzhia Oblasts, with formal military occupations beginning in the first week.

Annexation referendums

On 20 September, the authorities of the Donetsk People's Republic, the Luhansk People's Republic, as well as the occupation administrations of Kherson Oblast and Zaporizhzhia Oblast, announced referendums on joining Russia on 23–27 September.

On 27 September, Russian officials claimed that the accession "referendum" in Zaporizhzhia Oblast passed, with 93.11% of voters in favour of joining the Russian Federation.

Proclamations of independence of Kherson and Zaporizhzhia

Following the annexation referendums in Kherson and Zaporizhzhia oblasts, the military-civilian administrations of Kherson and Zaporizhzhia proclaimed independence as an intermediate step for Russian annexation. The day after the referendums were held, the KMCA proclaimed the independence of the 'Kherson region'. The ZMCA did the same for Zaporizhzhia, proclaiming independence for the 'Zaporozhye region'. 

On 29 September, Putin recognized Kherson and Zaporizhzhia regions as independent countries, hours before annexing them.

Annexation proceedings and borders 

On 30 September, Putin signed accession treaties with the four pro-Russian leaders of the regions, Leonid Pasechnik, Head of the Luhansk People's Republic, Denis Pushilin, Head of the Donetsk People's Republic, Yevgeny Balitsky, governor of the Zaporizhzhia Oblast and Volodymyr Saldo, governor of the Kherson Oblast. The exact boundaries of the territories declared annexed were however not legally defined, with the drafts of final annexation documents recursively referring to territories "on the day of the admission to the Russian Federation" and on the day of "the formation of a new constituent entity within the Russian Federation", both being prospective future events.

Hours after the declared annexation, the Ukrainian army recaptured several towns in Donetsk Oblast as part of the 2022 Ukrainian Kharkiv counteroffensive.

At the time of the annexation proceedings in early October, Russian authorities stated that the Luhansk People's Republic and Donetsk People's Republic (collectively called the Donbas) would maintain their 2014 borders. They also stated that elsewhere, the new Russian border is not clearly defined, and would be defined in consultation with local residents. It was also stated that Russian-held parts of Mykolaiv Oblast would be incorporated into Russian-controlled Kherson Province.

Russia did not hold the entirety of the Donetsk, Luhansk, Kherson and Zaporizhzhia Oblasts; at the time, it held about 60% of Donetsk Oblast, most of Luhansk Oblast, almost all of Kherson Oblast, and about 70% of Zaporizhzhia Oblast. It held almost none of Mykolaiv Oblast, and had recently lost all but a small part of the areas it had controlled in Kharkiv Oblast; Ukrainian intelligence claimed documents showing that a planned annexation referendum in Kharkiv Oblast had been cancelled as a result of these losses.

It was not clear whether Russia was claiming those portions of the named oblasts which it does not hold under military control. Russian authorities did state 
that all of the Donetsk region would be treated as part of Russia, and that the portion not under Russian control would be "liberated". The areas which were controlled by Russia at the time amount to about 15% of Ukraine's total area, more than  – roughly the size of Hungary or Portugal.

On 3 October, Putin's spokesperson Dmitry Peskov stated that the Donetsk and Luhansk people's republics will be annexed in "their 2014 borders", while as for the Zaporizhzhia and Kherson oblast Russia will "continue consultations with the residents as to their borders". These comments caused confusion and polemics among supporters of the annexation in Russia, with former Ukrainian parliamentarian and Russian collaborator Oleg Tsaryov arguing "there is no 2014 borders" of DNR and LNR.

Russia's State Duma, a rubber stamp for the Kremlin, voted unanimously to formalize the illegal annexations on 3 October. The annexation of each oblast received more "yes" votes than there were lawmakers present. Chairman Vyacheslav Volodin blamed the discrepancies on a "technical failure". The other house of Russia's parliament approved the annexations not long afterwards, and on 5 October it was reported that President Putin had signed them into law.

Consequences 

On 1 October, Russia began requiring Ukrainians wishing to cross into Ukrainian-held areas to fill out exit visas and get permission in advance. The number of people arriving from areas of Russian control slowed to a trickle, with talk of a "new Iron Curtain". Getting permission to leave can take up to two weeks and requires clearances from various Russian security agencies.

On 19 October, President Vladimir Putin declared martial law in the annexed areas.

Some estimates suggest that the reconstruction of the annexed territories would cost Russia between $100 and $200 billion. A state budget published on 29 September by the Kremlin revealed that 3.3 billion roubles (about US$59 million) had been set aside to rebuild the regions.

In December 2022, Vladimir Putin's spokesperson Dmitry Peskov said that any peace plans to end the Russo-Ukrainian War can only proceed from Ukraine's recognition of Russia's annexation of occupied regions in September 2022. In January 2023, Putin cited recognition of Russia's sovereignty over the annexed territories as a condition for peace talks with Ukraine.

Vladimir Putin speech

Russian president Vladimir Putin delivered a 37-minute long speech to both chambers of the Russian parliament about the annexation of Donetsk, Kherson, Luhansk and Zaporizhzhia oblasts into Russia. He spoke in the St. George Hall of the Grand Kremlin Palace in the Moscow Kremlin. The tone of the speech was strongly anti-American and anti-Western, to the point where observers described it as his most anti-Western speech to date.

Following the results of recent referendums on the annexation of occupied territories of Ukraine by Russia – which were condemned as shams by independent observers and the international community – Putin said that it was the "will of millions of people" in these territories to become part of Russia and to become Russian citizens "forever". He cited Article 1 of the UN charter as justification for his claims.

Within the speech, Putin spoke about the colonial past of the Western world, denouncing its "totalitarianism, despotism and apartheid", and accused it of attempting to create a neo-colonial and unipolar world order. He said that the West intended to destroy Russia as a nation, and called "the ruling circles of the so-called West" as "the enemy" threatening religion and morality, accusing the West of Satanism.

Putin also blamed the recent Nord Stream gas leaks on the "Anglo-Saxons" and said that the use of nuclear weapons by the US on Hiroshima and Nagasaki "set a precedent".

Reactions 

According to Reuters, if Russia "formally annexed a vast additional chunk of Ukraine, Putin would essentially be daring the United States and its European allies to risk a direct military confrontation", and would certainly escalate the ongoing war between Russia and Ukraine.

The UN's Under Secretary General for Political and Peacebuilding Affairs Rosemary DiCarlo rejected the referendum and said, "Unilateral actions aimed to provide a veneer of legitimacy to the attempted acquisition by force by one State of another State's territory while claiming to represent the will of the people, cannot be regarded as legal under international law".

A United Nations Security Council meeting was held on 30 September 2022, to vote on a resolution to condemn Russia for annexing these territories, resulting in 10 yes votes, one no vote, and four abstentions. The resolution failed because Russia vetoed it. Brazil, China, Gabon, and India abstained from the vote.

On 12 October 2022, the UN General Assembly passed Resolution ES-11/4, titled "Territorial integrity of Ukraine: defending the principles of the Charter of the United Nations", with 143 nations voting in favor, 5 against and 35 abstaining. It condemned the "illegal so-called referendums" and the "attempted illegal annexation" and demanded that Russia immediately reverse its decisions and withdraw its forces from Ukraine.

North Korea is the only UN member state that has recognized the Russian annexation of four partially occupied regions of Ukraine.

As a result of the annexation and of the previous sham referendums, an Internet meme portraying a satirical annexation of Kaliningrad Oblast by the Czech Republic as the "Královec Region" emerged.

Ukrainian response 

On 7 August 2022, the president of Ukraine, Volodymyr Zelenskyy, said that "if the occupiers proceed along the path of pseudo-referendums they will close for themselves any chance of talks with Ukraine and the free world, which the Russian side will clearly need at some point." After the ceremony of annexation, Zelenskyy said that Ukraine would not negotiate with Russia "as long as Putin is president", and requested a "fast-track" NATO membership in response.

On 29 September, Mykhailo Podolyak, an advisor to Zelenskyy, said that the Russian plans to annex parts of Ukraine "do not make legal sense" and that the annexation ceremony was a "Kremlin freak show".

The Ukrainian Kherson and Kharkiv counteroffensives allowed Ukraine to recapture parts of its territory, including Kherson City on 11 November.

See also

 Russian-occupied territories of Ukraine
 Crimean speech of Vladimir Putin
 Proposed Russian annexation of Transnistria
 Proposed Russian annexation of South Ossetia
 Post-Soviet states: "Near abroad"
 Russian-occupied territories
 Russian imperialism
 Russian irredentism
 Novorossiya (confederation)
 Nuclear threats during the 2022 Russian invasion of Ukraine

Geopolitical aspects
 List of military occupations
 List of national border changes (1914–present)
 Timeline of geopolitical changes (2000–present)
 Territorial nationalism

Notes

References

2022 in international relations
September 2022 events in Ukraine
September 2022 events in Russia
Russian annexations during the Russo-Ukrainian War
Russian occupation of Ukraine
Russification
Russo-Ukrainian War
2022 Russian invasion of Ukraine
Separatism in Ukraine
Russian irredentism
Annexation
Donbas
History of Kherson Oblast
History of Zaporizhzhia Oblast
Politics of the Donetsk People's Republic
Politics of the Luhansk People's Republic